Dimitrious Stanley (September 19, 1974 – February 9, 2023) was an American professional football player who was a wide receiver. He played in the Arena Football League for the New Jersey Red Dogs. He was born in Worthington, Ohio. He played college football for the Ohio State Buckeyes. He also played in the Canadian Football League for the Winnipeg Blue Bombers.

Stanley ran unsuccessfully for Columbus City Council in 2015.

Stanley was diagnosed with prostate cancer in September 2019, and died from the disease on February 9, 2023, at the age of 48.

References

1974 births
2023 deaths
People from Worthington, Ohio
Players of American football from Ohio
American football wide receivers
Canadian football wide receivers
New Jersey Red Dogs players
Winnipeg Blue Bombers players
Ohio State Buckeyes football players
Deaths from prostate cancer